Sand goby may refer to several species of fishes of Gobioidei:

 Pomatoschistus minutus, a species related to true gobies (Gobiidae: Gobiinae)
 Favonigobius, a genus related to true gobies (Gobiidae: Gobiinae).
 Kraemeriidae, a family of Gobioidei, also called sand sleepers.
 Neogobius pallasi, the Caspian sand goby, or White goby a species of Benthophilinae.
 Oxyeleotris marmorata often eaten in South-East Asia